Jeonju Stadium may refer to:

 Jeonju Baseball Stadium
 Jeonju Sports Complex Stadium
 Jeonju World Cup Stadium